Boss is an unincorporated community in Tarrant County, Texas, United States.

Notes

Unincorporated communities in Tarrant County, Texas
Unincorporated communities in Texas